Gheorghe Doja may refer to:
 the Romanian name of György Dózsa, a Székely peasant leader
 Gheorghe Doja, Ialomița, a commune in Ialomiţa County, Romania
 Gheorghe Doja, Mureș, a commune in Mureș County, Romania
 Gheorghe Doja, a village in Răcăciuni Commune, Bacău County, Romania